Émile Aubry may refer to:

 Émile Aubry (printer) (1829–1900), French printer and labour activist
 Émile Aubry (painter) (1880–1964), French artist

See also
 Emilie Aubry (born 1989), Swiss cyclist